Theary Chan Seng (born 1971) is a Cambodian-American human-rights activist and lawyer, the former executive director of the Centre for Social Development, and president of the Center for Cambodian Civic Education (CIVICUS Cambodia). She is the author of Daughter of the Killing Fields, a book about her experiences as a child during the Khmer Rouge regime.

She was imprisoned in a mass trial of opposition supporters in June 2022 and is currently serving a six-year sentence in Preah Vihear province.

Early life

Born as Chan Theary Seng, she moved to the United States in December 1980 with her four brothers after the Khmer Rouge was defeated by the Vietnamese army. At the age of seven, Theary had lost both her parents and many relatives to the regime.  After 1995, she volunteered with a number of labor and human-rights associations. She earned her Juris Doctor degree from the University of Michigan Law School in 2000, and she has been admitted to the New York State Bar Association and American Bar Association.  Seng returned to Cambodia in 2004.

Work

She was executive director of the Centre for Social Development, which largely focused on assuring a fair trial in the Khmer Rouge Tribunal. She is now president for CIVICUS, an organization that works on civic education, reconciliation and peace-building. She has worked with many former victims of the Khmer Rouge. Theary organized a darts campaign in Phnom Penh when President Barack Obama paid his first official visit to Cambodia. The game featured former Secretary of State Henry Kissinger, which brought attention to asserted American guilt in bringing the Khmer Rouge to power after the bombing.

Seng said that the American bombing in the early 1970s in Cambodia "had the direct consequence of killing half a million people and the indirect consequence of creating the conditions that gave us the Khmer Rouge. Kissinger is legally and morally responsible." She urged that the Khmer Rouge tribunal's mandate should be continued. During Kang Kek Iew aka Duch's trial, she withdrew as a civil party because of a controversy at the court.

See also

 Democratic Kampuchea
 Killing Fields
 Tuol Sleng
 Chum Mey
 Vann Nath
 Enemies of the People (film)

References

External links

 civicus-cam.com

Cambodian human rights activists
1971 births
Living people
University of Michigan Law School alumni
Naturalized citizens of the United States
Cambodian emigrants to the United States
Women human rights activists
21st-century women lawyers
People from Phnom Penh